This is a list of the first minority male lawyer(s) and judge(s) in Iowa. It includes the year in which the men were admitted to practice law (in parentheses). Also included are other distinctions, such as the first minority men in their state to graduate from law school or become a political figure.

Firsts in Iowa's history

Lawyers 

First African American male: A.H. Watkins (1874)  
 First African American male to practice before the Iowa Supreme Court: Samuel K. Adams (1875) 
 First Native American male: Thomas "Ted" St. Germaine (1904)  
First African American male to argue a case before the Supreme Court of Iowa: Samuel (S.) Joe Brown in 1906

State judges 

 First African American male: Luther T. Glanton, Jr. in 1958 
 First African American male (district court): Luther T. Glanton, Jr. in 1976  
 First male of part Vietnamese descent (Iowa Supreme Court): Christopher McDonald in 2019 
 First African American male (Third Judicial District): Robert Tiefenthaler in 2022

Firsts in local history 
 Alexander Clark, Jr.: First African American male to graduate from the University of Iowa College of Law (1879). His father Alexander Clark, Sr. would become the second African American law graduate in the university's history. They would go on to practice together as lawyers.
 Luther T. Glanton, Jr.: First African American male to serve as the Assistant Polk County Attorney (1951)

See also 

 List of first minority male lawyers and judges in the United States

Other topics of interest 

 List of first women lawyers and judges in the United States
 List of first women lawyers and judges in Iowa

References 

 
Minority, Iowa, first
Minority, Iowa, first
Legal history of Iowa
Iowa lawyers
Lists of people from Iowa